Amit Banerjee (born 25 October 1987) is an Indian cricketer who plays as a bowler. He played four first-class matches for Bengal in 2015.

See also
 List of Bengal cricketers

References

External links
 

1987 births
Living people
Indian cricketers
Bengal cricketers
People from Hooghly district